Enrique de la Mora y Palomar (16 June 1907 – 9 May 1978) was a Mexican architect who designed prominent university buildings and Roman Catholic churches in which he experimented with hyperbolic-paraboloid roofs. He is generally regarded, along with the Spaniard Félix Candela, as one of the most famous structural expressionists in Mexico.

De la Mora was distinguished with the National Prize for Architecture in 1947 and some of his works, particularly his Faculty of Philosophy and Letters at the National Autonomous University of Mexico's Ciudad Universitaria, is now part of a UNESCO's World Heritage Site since 2007.

Selected works
 La Purísima (Monterrey, 1939)
 Master plan of the Monterrey Institute of Technology and Higher Education (Monterrey, 1945)
 Faculty of Philosophy and Letters of the National Autonomous University of Mexico, (Mexico City, 1947)
 Rectorate building of the Monterrey Institute of Technology and Higher Education (Monterrey, 1952)
 Mexican Stock Exchange (Mexico City, 1955)
 Nuestra Señora de Guadalupe (Madrid, 1965)

References

National Autonomous University of Mexico alumni
People from Guadalajara, Jalisco
1907 births
1978 deaths
20th-century Mexican architects